Kurt Julian Weill (March 2, 1900April 3, 1950) was a German-born American composer active from the 1920s in his native country, and in his later years in the United States. He was a leading composer for the stage who was best known for his fruitful collaborations with Bertolt Brecht. With Brecht, he developed productions such as his best-known work, The Threepenny Opera, which included the ballad "Mack the Knife". Weill held the ideal of writing music that served a socially useful purpose, Gebrauchsmusik. He also wrote several works for the concert hall and a number of works on Jewish themes. He became a United States citizen on August 27, 1943.

Family and childhood 
Weill was born on March 2, 1900, the third of four children to Albert Weill (1867–1950) and Emma Weill (née Ackermann; 1872–1955). He grew up in a religious Jewish family in the "Sandvorstadt", the Jewish quarter in Dessau in Saxony, where his father was a cantor. At the age of twelve, Weill started taking piano lessons and made his first attempts at writing music; his earliest preserved composition was written in 1913 and is titled "Mi Addir: Jewish Wedding Song".

In 1915, Weill started taking private lessons with Albert Bing, kapellmeister at the "Herzogliches Hoftheater zu Dessau", who taught him piano, composition, music theory, and conducting. Weill performed publicly on piano for the first time in 1915, both as an accompanist and soloist. The following years he composed numerous lieder to the lyrics of poets such as Joseph von Eichendorff, Arno Holz, and Anna Ritter, as well as a cycle of five songs titled Ofrahs Lieder to a German translation of a text by Yehuda Halevi.

Weill graduated with an Abitur from the Oberrealschule of Dessau in 1918, and enrolled at the Berliner Hochschule für Musik at the age of 18, where he studied composition with Engelbert Humperdinck, conducting with Rudolf Krasselt, and counterpoint with Friedrich E. Koch, and also attended philosophy lectures by Max Dessoir and Ernst Cassirer. The same year, he wrote his first string quartet (in B minor).

Musical career

Early work and compositions 
Weill's family experienced financial hardship in the aftermath of World War I, and in July 1919, Weill abandoned his studies and returned to Dessau, where he was employed as a répétiteur at the Friedrich-Theater under the direction of the new Kapellmeister, Hans Knappertsbusch. During this time, he composed an orchestral suite in E-flat major, a symphonic poem on Rainer Maria Rilke's The Lay of the Love and Death of Cornet Christopher Rilke, and Schilflieder ("Reed Songs"), a cycle of five songs to poems by Nikolaus Lenau. In December 1919, through the help of Humperdinck, Weill was appointed as Kapellmeister at the newly founded Stadttheater in Lüdenscheid, where he directed opera, operetta, and singspiel for five months. He subsequently composed a cello sonata and Ninon de Lenclos, a now lost one-act operatic adaptation of a 1905 play by Ernst Hardt. From May to September 1920, Weill spent a few months in Leipzig, where his father had become the director of a Jewish orphanage. Before he returned to Berlin, in September 1920, he composed Sulamith, a choral fantasy for soprano, female choir, and orchestra.

Studies with Busoni 

Back in Berlin, Weill had an interview with Ferruccio Busoni in December 1920. After examining some of Weill's compositions, Busoni accepted him as one of five master students in composition at the Preussische Akademie der Künste in Berlin.

From January 1921 to December 1923, Weill studied music composition with him and also counterpoint with Philipp Jarnach in Berlin. During his first year he composed his first symphony, Sinfonie in einem Satz, as well as the lieder Die Bekehrte (Goethe) and two Rilkelieder for voice and piano. Busoni, then approaching the end of his life, was a major influence on Weill. Where Weill's early compositions reflect the post-Wagnerian Romanticism and Expressionism common in German classical music of that era, Busoni was a Neoclassicist. Busoni's influence can be seen especially in Weill's vocal and stage works, which moved steadily away from having the music reflect the characters' emotions to have it function as (often ironic) commentary. This was Weill's own path to some of the same notions of Epic theater and the Verfremdungseffekt (distancing effect) advocated by his future collaborator Brecht.</ref>

Amanda Palmer, singer-pianist of the 'Brechtian Punk Cabaret' duo The Dresden Dolls, has Kurt Weill's name on the front of her keyboard (a pun on the name of the instrument maker Kurzweil) as a tribute to the composer. In 1991, the seminal Swiss industrial band The Young Gods released their album of Kurt Weill songs, The Young Gods Play Kurt Weill. Weill has also been often cited as an influence on Goldfrapp's Felt Mountain. In 2008, Weill's songs were performed by Canadian musicians (including Sarah Slean and Mary Margaret O'Hara) in a tribute concert as part of the first annual Canwest Cabaret Festival in Toronto. In 2009 Duke Special released an EP, Huckleberry Finn, of five songs from an unfinished musical by Kurt Weill based on the novel by Mark Twain.

Kurt Weill is a member of the American Theater Hall of Fame.

Kurt Weill Centre

The Kurt Weill Centre (German:Kurt-Weill-Zentrum) in Dessau was founded in 1993. It provides a museum, library, archive and media centre and organises an annual festival celebrating the composer's work. It is housed in the Feininger house, a house designed by the architect Walter Gropius which was originally lived in by the artist Lyonel Feininger. The property is part of the World Heritage site the Bauhaus and its Sites in Weimar, Dessau and Bernau. The centre, with its collection of material on Weill, is listed as a cultural memorial of national importance. The centre is one of the "Beacons of light" of the Konferenz Nationaler Kultureinrichtungen (Conference of National Cultural Institutions), a union of cultural institutions in the new states of Germany i.e. area that was formerly East Germany.

Kurt Weill Foundation for Music 
Founded by Lotte Lenya in 1962, the non-profit, private foundation is dedicated to promoting understanding of Weill's life and works and preserving the legacies of Weill and Lenya. The foundation administers the internationally recognized Lotte Lenya Competition, a grant program, various sponsorships and fellowships, the Weill-Lenya Research Center, and the Kurt Weill Prize, and publishes the Kurt Weill Edition and the Kurt Weill Newsletter. Trustees of the New York-based organization have included Harold Prince, Victoria Clark, Jeanine Tesori, Tazewell Thompson, and Teresa Stratas.

Relatives
Weill's grandmother was Jeanette Hochstetter of Liedolsheim in Baden-Württemberg. Weill was one of four members of the same Hochstetter family to lead distinguished careers in the fields of music and literature. His first cousin once removed was Caesar Hochstetter (born January 12, 1863, in Ladenburg, a suburb of Mannheim – his date and place of death are unknown but this was probably during The Holocaust), a composer and arranger who collaborated with Max Reger and who dedicated Aquarelles, Op. 25, to him.

His second cousin was the childhood prodigy pianist, Lisy Fischer (born August 22, 1900, Zürich, Switzerland – died June 6, 1999, Newcastle upon Tyne, England).

Compositions

Stage works

Concert works

Cantatas
1920 : Sulamith, choral fantasy for soprano, female chorus and orchestra (lost)
1927 : Der neue Orpheus, cantata for soprano, solo violin and orchestra, Op. 16 (text: Yvan Goll)
1927 : Der Tod im Wald, cantata for bass and band (originally belonged to Das Berliner Requiem)
1928 : Das Berliner Requiem, cantata for tenor, baritone, male chorus (or three male voices) and wind orchestra (text: Bertolt Brecht)
1929 : Der Lindberghflug, cantata for tenor, baritone and bass soloists, chorus and orchestra (text: Bertolt Brecht, first version with music by Paul Hindemith and Weill, second version, also 1929, with music exclusively by Weill)
1940 : The Ballad of Magna Carta, cantata for tenor and bass soloists, chorus and orchestra (text: Maxwell Anderson)
1946 : "Kiddush", commissioned by cantor David Putterman, premiered at a Kiddush on May 10, 1946, at Park Avenue Synagogue

Chamber music
1918 : String Quartet in B minor (without opus number)
1923 : String Quartet, Op. 8
1919–1921 : Sonata for Cello and Piano

Piano music
1917 : Intermezzo
1937 : Albumblatt for Erika (transcription of the pastorale from Der Weg der Verheissung)

Orchestral works
1919 : Suite for orchestra
1919 : Die Weise von Liebe und Tod, symphonic poem for orchestra after Rainer Maria Rilke (lost)
1921 : Symphony No.1 in one movement for orchestra
1922 : Divertimento for orchestra, Op. 5 (unfinished, reconstructed by David Drew)
1922 : Sinfonia Sacra, Fantasia, Passacaglia and Hymnus for orchestra, Op. 6 (unfinished)
1923 : Quodlibet, suite for orchestra from the pantomime Zaubernacht, Op. 9
1925 : Concerto for violin and wind orchestra, Op. 12
1927 : Bastille Musik, suite for wind orchestra (arranged by David Drew, 1975) from the stage music to Gustav III, by August Strindberg
1929 : Kleine Dreigroschenmusik, suite from Die Dreigroschenoper for wind orchestra, piano and percussion, (premiere conducted by Otto Klemperer)
1934 : Suite panaméenne for chamber orchestra, (from )
1934 : Symphony No. 2 in three movements for orchestra, (premiere by Royal Concertgebouw orchestra under Bruno Walter)
1947 : Hatikvah, arrangement of the Israeli National Anthem for orchestra

Lieder, Lieder cycles, songs and chansons
1919 : "Die stille Stadt", for voice and piano, text: Richard Dehmel
1923 : Frauentanz, Op. 10, song cycle for soprano, flute, viola, clarinet, horn and bassoon (after medieval poems)
1923 : Stundenbuch, song cycle for baritone and orchestra, text: Rainer Maria Rilke
1925 : "Klopslied", for high voice, two piccolos and bassoon ("Ick sitze da un' esse Klops" – Berliner Lied)
1927 : Vom Tod im Wald (Death in the Forest), Op. 23, ballad for bass solo and ten wind instruments, text: Bertolt Brecht
1928 : "Berlin im Licht-Song", slow-fox, text: Kurt Weill; composed for the exhibition Berlin im Licht, first performance in Wittenbergplatz (with orchestra) on October 13, and on October 16 in the Kroll Opera (with voice and piano)
1928 : "Die Muschel von Margate: Petroleum Song", slow-fox, text: Felix Gasbarra for the play by Leo Lania, Konjunktur
1928 : "Zu Potsdam unter den Eichen" ("In Potsdam under the Oak Trees"), song for voice and piano, alternatively male chorus a cappella, text: Bertolt Brecht
1928 : "Das Lied von den braunen Inseln", text: Lion Feuchtwanger, from the play by same author, Petroleum Inseln
1930?: "Lied vom weißen Käse" ("Song of the White Cheese") – unpublished, discovered in Berlin at the Free University of Berlin in 2017
1933 : "Der Abschiedsbrief", text: Erich Kästner, intended for Marlene Dietrich
1933 : "La complainte de Fantômas", text: Robert Desnos; for a broadcast of Fantômas in November 1933 (the music was lost, and later reconstructed by Jacques Loussier for Catherine Sauvage)
1933 : "Es regnet" ("It's Raining"), text: Jean Cocteau (direct into German)
1934 : "Je ne t'aime pas", text: Maurice Magre for the soprano Lys Gauty
1934 : "Les Filles de Bordeaux", text: Jacques Deval, from 
1934 : "J'attends un navire", text: Jacques Deval, from Marie Galante; as an independent song for Lys Gauty; used for the "Hymne der Resistance" during the Second World War
1934 : "Youkali" (originally the "Tango habanera", instrumental movement in Marie Galante), Text: 
1934 : "Complainte de la Seine", text: Maurice Magre
1939 : "Stopping by Woods on a Snowy Evening", song for voice and piano, text: Robert Frost (unfinished)
1939 : "Nanna's Lied", text: Bertolt Brecht, the song of a prostitute, from a play satirizing the Nazi party, written as a Christmas present for his wife Lotte Lenya; quotes Ballade des dames du temps jadis
1942–47 : Three Walt Whitman Songs, later Four Walt Whitman Songs for voice and piano (or orchestra), text: Walt Whitman
Oh Captain! My Captain! (Christmas 1941)
Dirge for Two Veterans (January 1942)
Beat! Beat! Drums! (Spring 1942)
Come Up From The Fields, Father (1947)
1942 : Mine Eyes Have Seen the Glory, patriotic song arrangements for narrator, male chorus, and orchestra, of the "Battle Hymn of the Republic" (text: Julia Ward Howe), "The Star-Spangled Banner" (text: Francis Scott Key), "America" (text: Samuel Francis Smith) and "Beat! Beat! Drums!" (text: Walt Whitman)
1942–44 : Propaganda Songs, for voice and piano; written for the Lunch Hours Follies performed for the workers of a shipbuilding workshop in New York, then broadcast:
1942 : "Buddy on the Nightshift", text: Oscar Hammerstein
1942 : "Schickelgruber", text: Howard Dietz
1942 : "Und was bekam des Soldaten Weib?" ("And what was sent to the soldier's wife?"), ballad for voice and piano, text: Bertolt Brecht
1944 : "Wie lange noch?", text: Walter Mehring; premiere: Lotte Lenya

Choral
1923 : Recordare, Op. 11

Film music
1931: The Threepenny Opera, director G. W. Pabst, two versions: in German and French
1938 : You and Me, director Fritz Lang
1945 : Where Do We Go from Here?, text: Ira Gershwin
1948 : One Touch of Venus, starring: Robert Walker, Ava Gardner and Dick Haymes

Select discography

Orchestral, chamber, choral and other works
Berliner Requiem / Violin Concerto, Op. 12 / Vom Tod im Walde. Ensemble Musique Oblique/ Philippe Herreweghe (Harmonia Mundi, 1997)
Kleine Dreigroschenmusik / Mahagonny Songspiel / Happy End / Berliner Requiem / Violin Concerto, Op. 12 / Ballade vom Tod im Walde, Op. 23 / Pantomime I (from Der Protagonist, Op. 14) London Sinfonietta, David Atherton, Nona Liddell (violin), Meriel Dickinson (mezzo-soprano), Mary Thomas (mezzo-soprano), Philip Langridge (tenor), Ian Partridge (tenor), Benjamin Luxon (baritone), Michael Rippon (bass), (Deutsche Grammophon 4594422, 1999)
Kurt Weill à Paris, Marie Galante and other works. Loes Luca, Ensemble Dreigroschen, directed by Giorgio Bernasconi, assai, 2000
Melodie Kurta Weill'a i coś ponadto Kazik Staszewski (SP Records, 2001)
Complete String Quartets. Leipziger Streichquartett (MDG 307 1071–2)
Symphonies 1 & 2. BBC Symphony Orchestra, Gary Bertini (EMI, 1968)

Song collections
Lotte Lenya sings Kurt Weill's The Seven Deadly Sins & Berlin Theatre Songs (Sony 1997)
Speak Low – Songs by Kurt Weill – Anne Sofie von Otter, conducted by John Eliot Gardiner (Deutsche Grammophon 1995)
Youkali: Art Songs by Satie, Poulenc and Weill. Patricia O'Callaghan (Marquis, 2003)
The Unknown Kurt Weill (Nonesuch LP D-79019, 1981) – Teresa Stratas, soprano, Richard Woitach, piano. Track list: "Nanna's Lied" (1939), "Complainte de la Seine" (1934), "Klops-Lied" (1925), "Berlin im Licht-song" (1928), "Und was bekam des Soldaten Weib?" (1943), "Die Muschel von Margate: Petroleum Song" (1928), "Wie Lange Noch?" (1944), "Youkali: Tango Habanera" (1935?), "Der Abschiedsbrief" (1933?), "Es Regnet" (1933), "Buddy on the Nightshift" (1942), "Schickelgruber" (1942), "Je ne t'aime pas" (1934), "Das Lied von den Braunen Inseln" (1928)
Georgia Brown: September Song – Music of Kurt Weill, Decca LP SKL 4509 (1962), conducted by Ian Fraser
Dee Dee Bridgewater: This is New (2002)

Tributes
Lost in the Stars: The Music of Kurt Weill – produced by Hal Wilner, with performances by Tom Waits, Lou Reed, Sting, Marianne Faithfull, Carla Bley, Charlie Haden, John Zorn and others. (A&M Records, 1985)
September Songs – The Music of Kurt Weill – also produced by Wilner, with performances by Elvis Costello, PJ Harvey, Nick Cave, William S. Burroughs, and others (Sony Music, 1997)
Gianluigi Trovesi/Gianni Coscia: Round About Weill (ECM, 2005)
The Young Gods Play Kurt Weill (Pias, April 1991), studio recording of the songs performed live in 1989.
Ben Bagley's Kurt Weill Revisited and Kurt Weill Revisited, Vol. 2, with performances by Chita Rivera, Ann Miller, Estelle Parsons, John Reardon, Tammy Grimes, Nell Carter, Arthur Siegel, and Jo Sullivan, among others. (Painted Smiles)
An Evening of Kurt Weill, starring Bebe Neuwirth, Roger Rees, and Larry Marshall, was performed in New York City at Alice Tully Hall; Rees directed the production.

See also
 A Kurt Weill Cabaret (Broadway 1979), originally The World of Kurt Weill in Song (off-Broadway 1963)
 Berlin to Broadway with Kurt Weill (off-Broadway 1971, Broadway 2000)
 LoveMusik (Broadway 2007)

Notes and references
Notes

References

Sources

Further reading
David Drew. Kurt Weill: A Handbook (Berkeley, Los Angeles: University of California Press, 1987). .
David Drew (editor). Über Kurt Weill (Frankfurt am Main, Suhrkamp, 1975)  – collection of texts, including an introduction by Drew and texts by Theodor W. Adorno
Pamela Katz. The Partnership: Brecht, Weill, Three Women, and Germany on the Brink (Nan A. Talese, Doubleday, 2015). 
Kim H. Kowalke. A New Orpheus: Essays on Kurt Weill (New Haven: Yale University Press, 1986). .

Ronald Sanders. The Days Grow Short: The Life and Music of Kurt Weill (New York, Holt, Rinehart and Winston, 1980). .
, Kurt Weill (Rowohlt, Reinbek bei Hamburg, 2000) 
Donald Spoto. Lenya A Life (Little, Brown and Company 1989).
Lys Symonette & Kim H. Kowalke (ed. & trans.) Speak Low (When You Speak Love): The Letters of Kurt Weill and Lotte Lenya (University of California Press, 1996)

External links

Kurt Weill Centre, Dessau
Kurt Weill Foundation, including a detailed list of works
Profile, Schott Music
The OREL Foundation – Kurt Weill's biography and links to bibliography, discography and media.

 Program note to Kurt Weill's Symphony No. 2 from the Los Angeles Chamber Orchestra
 Yale University's Gilmore Music Library has an important collection of Kurt Weill's Papers and Music, especially from his years in America
Finding aid to Universal Edition-Kurt Weill Archives – Manuscripts on deposit at the Ruth T. Watanabe Special Collections Department, Sibley Music Library, Eastman School of Music, University of Rochester

Universal Edition

1900 births
1950 deaths
20th-century American composers
20th-century American Jews
20th-century American male musicians
20th-century classical composers
20th-century German composers
American classical composers
American classical musicians
American male classical composers
American musical theatre composers
American opera composers
Broadway composers and lyricists
German classical composers
German male classical composers
German musical theatre composers
German socialists
Jewish American classical composers
Jewish classical musicians
Jewish American songwriters
Jewish emigrants from Nazi Germany to the United States
Jewish opera composers
Male musical theatre composers
Male opera composers
Mendelssohn Prize winners
People from Dessau-Roßlau
People from Haverstraw, New York
People from the Duchy of Anhalt
Répétiteurs
Tony Award winners